Kicker or The Kicker may refer to:

Sports 
 Placekicker, a position in American and Canadian football
 Kicker (sports magazine), in Germany
 Kicker, the German colloquial term for an association football player
 Kicker, the word used in Belgium, Finland, Germany, and Russia for table football
 Kicker, another name for Kickball
 Flea Kicker, a play executed by the Nebraska Cornhuskers football team
 Nicolás Kicker (born 1992), Argentine tennis player
 Kicker (dominoes), a domino tile that increases the count by one spot
 Kicker, the upward-sloping part of a jump in a ski/snowboard terrain park

Association football 
 BSC Kickers 1900 Berlin from Berlin, Germany
 Kickers Emden from Emden, Lower Saxony, Germany
 Kickers Frankfurt, one of the two teams who formed the actual Eintracht Frankfurt, from Frankfurt am Main, Hesse, Germany
 Kickers Offenbach from Offenbach am Main, Hesse, Germany
 Kickers Würzburg from Würzburg, Bavaria, Germany
 Calgary Kickers from Calgary, Alberta, Canada
 California Kickers from Hollywood, California, United States
 Denver Kickers from Denver, Colorado, United States
 Los Angeles Kickers from Los Angeles, California, United States
 SV Kickers Pforzheim from Pforzheim, Germany
 Potsdamer Kickers from Potsdam, Brandenburg, Germany
 Richmond Kickers from Richmond, Virginia, United States
 St. Petersburg Kickers from St. Petersburg, Florida, United States.
 Stuttgarter Kickers from Stuttgart, Baden-Württemberg, Germany
 Violet Kickers F.C. from Jamaica

Gambling 
 A kicker (poker) or side card, a card in a poker hand that does not itself take part in determining the rank of the hand, but that may be used to break ties between hands of the same rank
 "Kicker", an option in the Connecticut Lottery's Cash 5 game
 "The Kicker", an option in the Ohio Lottery's Classic Lotto game

Music
 The Kicker (Bobby Hutcherson album), 1999
 The Kicker (Joe Henderson album), 1967
 Kicker (EP), by The Get Up Kids (2018)

Other
 Kicker (journalism)
 Kicker (KDE), the taskbar for the K Desktop Environment
 Kicker (Transformers), a Transformers: Energon character
 Kicker Statue, created by sculptor Josef Tabachnyk
 Kickers, a European clothing and footwear brand
 Kicker, the common name for the Oregon tax rebate
 On a sailboat, the boom vang
 A part of a pinball machine, see Pinball#Kickers and slingshots
 Alternative name for Shao-lin's Road, a video game